"All My Life" is a song recorded by American R&B duo K-Ci & JoJo. The track was produced and written by Joel "JoJo" Hailey and Rory Bennett for K-Ci & JoJo's debut studio album, Love Always (1997). The song was released to airplay in January 1998 and was released physically on March 17, 1998, as the third single from the album through MCA Records. "All My Life" is an R&B and soul song. Music critics have claimed this as the duo's most successful song of their career.

"All My Life" was a commercial success, and topped the US Billboard Hot 100 for three consecutive weeks. It was certified platinum in the US, and was the duo's longest-running number-one single of their career. "All My Life" performed well internationally, making the Top Ten list in many countries including Australia, Belgium, Germany, Netherlands, New Zealand, Norway, Sweden, Switzerland, and the United Kingdom. It achieved platinum status in Australia, New Zealand, and the United Kingdom.

Background and writing 

In 1997, K-Ci & JoJo traveled to various recording studios in California and New York with multiple relatively unknown record producers for recording of their debut album, Love Always. Joel initially wrote the song, using his daughter as inspiration. "All My Life" was originally written by Joel Hailey for a female artist on A&M Records, but ultimately decided to keep the song. "All My Life" was recorded at Audio Achievements in Torrance, California. Rory Bennett contributed on the song by helping the writing and the production.

Music and theme 
"All My Life" is a slow-tempo love song ballad, performed in slow groove. It is composed in the key of D major and is set to 63 beats per minute in the time signature of common time. "All My Life" has been classified as an R&B and soul song.

Release and reception 
"All My Life" was released as the third single from the album Love Always. The song was released in the United States on March 17, 1998, as a CD single. It was released on March 30, 1998, in Germany as a maxi single. "Don't Rush (Take Love Slowly)" was included as the B-side on all copies. In many European countries, "All My Life" was released as a maxi single without a B-side, but contained a radio edit as well as two remixes. On September 18, 2001, "All My Life" would be available to download digitally via the iTunes Store, but "Tell Me It's Real" was included instead of "Don't Rush".

The song was praised by music critics, who classify it as the duo's most successful song. Steve Heuy of AllMusic calls "All My Life" a "sweet ballad" and claims the song "broke them big". Billboard magazine writer Aliya King wrote "All My Life" "cemented the duo's reputation as sensitive and soulful crooners." Gerald Martinez from New Sunday Times described it as "scintillating", noting that it "features some stunning vocal arrangements."

Chart performance 
The single debuted on the US Billboard Hot 100 at number 15. It reached the chart's top spot the following week. The song stayed on the Hot 100 for 35 weeks. "All My Life" achieved success on other Billboard charts, including the Hot R&B/Hip-Hop Songs chart, peaking at number one, the Rhythmic Top 40 chart, peaking at number one, and the Hot Adult Contemporary Tracks chart, peaking at number 26. It would also rank at number 98 on Billboards Hot 100 decade-end chart.

Internationally, "All My Life" performed just as well, peaking inside the top ten in multiple charts. It peaked at number two on the Australian ARIA Singles Chart and was certified platinum by the Australian Recording Industry Association for shipments of 70,000 units in Australia. The song also peaked at number four on the Swedish Singles Top 60 and was certified gold by the IFPI Sweden. "All My Life" also peaked at number 12 in Austria, number 3 in Belgium (Flanders), number 11 in Belgium (Wallonia), number 43 in France, number one in the Netherlands, number one in New Zealand, number 2 in Norway, number 4 in Switzerland, and number 8 in the United Kingdom,

Accolades 
"All My Life" was nominated for multiple awards. At the 1999 Grammy Awards, "All My Life" was nominated for Best R&B Vocal Performance and Best R&B Song. Finally, the video was nominated for Best R&B Video at the 1999 MTV Video Music Awards.

Music video 
The song's accompanying music video was directed by Lara M. Schwartz. It begins by showing many of the people in the crowd, followed by a pianist playing the introduction. It eventually pans over the two as they begin singing into their microphones. Every so often, an outside scene of love will show up. Examples are of a teacher helping a student read, parents with a newborn baby, a woman giving a homeless man food, a lesbian couple laying in bed and talking, and a father with his daughter. In between these scenes, the camera pans over the stage, as well as the people in the crowd and the musicians. At the end, the camera shows a sunset and pans away.

The video was nominated for Best R&B Video at the 1998 MTV Video Music Awards, losing to Wyclef Jean's "Gone Till November". The song was also nominated for two Grammy Awards.

Track listings 

12-inch maxi single
 "All My Life"  – 3:42
 "All My Life"  – 5:31
 "All My Life"  – 4:54
 "All My Life"  – 4:26

Digital download
 "All My Life" – 5:32
 "All My Life"  – 4:28
 "Tell Me It's Real" – 4:41
 "Tell Me It's Real"  – 3:50

Curtis Moore remix
 "All My Life"  – 6:34
 "All My Life"  – 6:34

France 12-inch maxi single
 "All My Life"  – 3:42
 "All My Life"  – 5:31

Charts

Weekly charts

Year-end charts

Decade-end charts

Certifications and sales

Release history

See also 
 Dutch Top 40 number-one hits of 1998
 List of Hot 100 number-one singles of 1998 (U.S.)
 List of number-one R&B singles of 1998 (U.S.)
 List of number-one singles in Australia during the 1990s

References 

1990s ballads
1997 songs
1998 singles
Billboard Hot 100 number-one singles
Contemporary R&B ballads
K-Ci & JoJo songs
MCA Records singles
Music videos directed by Lara M. Schwartz
Number-one singles in New Zealand
Soul ballads